Peak Range is a small national park in Central Queensland, Australia, 760 km northwest of Brisbane.  It is located in the Brigalow Belt bioregion.
 
Two rare of threatened plant species and two animal species have been identified in the park.  There are Trioncinia patens, Dichanthium queenslandicum, the koala and Geophaps scripta scripta.

See also

 Protected areas of Queensland

References

National parks of Central Queensland
Protected areas established in 1983